Shwegyin Township  is a township in Bago District in the Bago Region of Myanmar. The principal town is Shwegyin (town).

References

Townships of the Bago Region
Bago District